Al-Maṣāni is a village in south-western Yemen. It is located in the Abyan Governorate. It is currently controlled by a faction of the Islamic State that split off from Ansar Al-Sharia to pledge allegiance to Abu Bakr al-Baghdadi. Several sources show that Al-Qaeda had disowned the faction.

External links
Towns and villages in the Abyan Governorate

Populated places in Abyan Governorate
Villages in Yemen